When the Jewish Consumptives' Relief Society (JCRS) opened its doors in September 1904, it had only seven patients housed in white wooden "Tucker" tents. Over the next fifty years, however, the JCRS served over 10,000 patients, more than half of those patients were from New York City. While National Jewish Health was founded earlier to also treat tuberculosis, and both were nondenominational, JCRS was established to serve the West Colfax Jewish community with an Orthodox kitchen as opposed to the more secular National Jewish Health. The campus was also home to the first synagogue in Jefferson County, Colorado. Completed in 1926, the Isaac Solomon Synagogue was the third synagogue on the JCRS campus and was actively used from 1926 until the 1950s. Since 1980, the campus has been on the National Register of Historic Places, though the original application does have several factual errors, such as confusing the 1926 synagogue with its 1911 predecessor.

Among the founders of JCRS was Dr. Charles David Spivak, who led the organization from 1904, until his death in 1927. 
Spivak was a political refugee from Russia (modern-day Ukraine) who attended medical school in Philadelphia before moving to Denver, Colorado. He was the first editor of the Denver Jewish News (now known as the Intermountain Jewish News) and the father of H. David Spivak, the first Jewish artist of note in Colorado.

Tuberculosis brings people to Colorado 
By the late 19th century, Colorado and the American Southwest had become famous for the health benefits of a dry, sunny climate. At that time, the only known treatment for tuberculosis was clean air and sunshine and hundreds of people with tuberculosis descended upon Denver in hopes of finding a cure for what was then the nation's leading cause of death. Consequently, many people with tuberculosis spent their last dollars coming to Colorado. By the 1890s, it was estimated that one out of every three residents of the state was there for respiratory reasons. However, no facilities existed to provide treatment or shelter to these victims. In Denver, victims of tuberculosis were literally dying in the streets as boarding houses often banned "lungers," as they were called.

In its history as a sanatorium, the JCRS hospital also became known as a center of Yiddish poetry and many of the patients were or became well-known literary figures, including Yehoash, Lune Mattes, H. Leivick, and Shea Tenenbaum.

Present mission

In 1954, JCRS repurposed itself as the American Medical Center at Denver dedicated to cancer research and treatment. A few years later, in 1957, approximately 20 acres of the original JCRS campus along West Colfax Avenue between Kendall and Pierce Streets were developed into the JCRS Shopping Center. Originally rented as revenue for the hospital, AMC later sold the shopping center and, in 1979, Casa Bonita moved into the JCRS Shopping Center. At about the same time, AMC also began renting the New York Building to Jefferson County and later sold the building to the county.

In 2002, as AMC merged with the University of Colorado Anschutz Medical Campus, the Rocky Mountain College of Art and Design purchased the historic JCRS campus. The college later purchased the Albertson's Building in the Lamar Station (JCRS) Shopping Center.

People
Hospital staff and supporters
Philip Hillkowitz
Rabbi Charles Kauvar of the Beth HaMedrosh Hagodol-Beth Joseph
Rabbi William S. Friedman of the Temple Emanuel (Denver)
Jacob Marinoff
May Arno Schwatt
Charles David Spivak

Patients (In chronological order)
Yehoash (poet)
Shayna Korngold (sister of former Israeli Prime Minister Golda Meir)
Yehuda Leib Ginsburg
H. Leivick
Shea Tenenbaum
Max Lazarus

Academic works 
In 2009, Jeanne Abrams, Ph.D., published Dr. Charles David Spivak: A Jewish Immigrant and the American Tuberculosis Movement (2009)
In 2020, Thomas E. Keefe, Ed.D., published This Day in RMCAD and the Historic JCRS | AMC Campus: A Diary of Care, Research, and Creativity (2020)
In 2022, Gracie Daniels published "A Blast the Past Past: RMCAD’s Campus History"

Exhibitions and events 
The University of Denver has a permanent online exhibit "Chasing the Cure" in which the Jewish Consumptives' Relief Society features prominently.
In 2019, the Jewish Consumptives' Relief Society was featured in the "Lakewood: A 20th Century Journey" exhibition as part of Lakewood's 50th Anniversary celebration
In 2022, The Rocky Mountain College of Art + Design hosted the descendants of Dr. Charles D. Spivak and H. David Spivak. Professor Thomas E. Keefe presented a lecture on the Jewish Consumptives' Relief Society, the Spivak Family, and H. David Spivak in particular.

References

External links
 http://www.rmcad.edu

Hospitals in Colorado
Jewish medical organizations
Jews and Judaism in Colorado
Tuberculosis sanatoria in the United States
Buildings and structures in Denver
Synagogues completed in 1926
National Register of Historic Places in Jefferson County, Colorado
Buildings and structures completed in 1904